Junior Robinson may refer to:

 Junior Robinson (American football) (1968–1995), American and Canadian football player
 Junior Robinson (Canadian football) (born 1961), Canadian football player
 Junior Robinson (basketball) (born 1996) American basketball player
 Junior Robinson (Musician) (born 2003) British experimental musician.